Ruku (also Romanized as Rūkū) is a village in Pir Sohrab Rural District, in the Central District of Chabahar County, Sistan and Baluchestan Province, Iran. At the 2006 census, its population was 42, in 10 families.

References 

Populated places in Chabahar County